probabilist may refer to:
 A follower of probabilism (in theology or philosophy)
 A mathematician who studies and applies probability theory
 List of mathematical probabilists